Vellaiahpuram is a village in Ramanathapuram, Tamil Nadu, India.

References

Villages in Ramanathapuram district